Kamal Amer (13 June 1942 – 4 March 2021) was an Egyptian politician and military commander.

Biography
Amer was trained at the Egyptian Military Academy and Nasser Military Academy. During his military career, Amer ascended to the role of Commander of the Third Army. President Hosni Mubarak appointed him Director of Military Intelligence, a position he held until 1997. From 9 July 1997 to 21 November 1999, he was Governor of the Matrouh Governorate. He then served as Governor of the Aswan Governorate from 31 October 1999 until 17 July 2001. From December 2012 to June 2013, he served in the Shura Council.

Kamal Amer died of COVID-19 in Cairo on 4 March 2021.

References

1942 births
2021 deaths
Military personnel from Cairo
Members of the House of Representatives (Egypt)
Members of the Shura Council
Deaths from the COVID-19 pandemic in Egypt
Egyptian Military Academy alumni
Directors of the Military Intelligence and Reconnaissance (Egypt)
Governors of Matrouh
Governors of  Aswan
Politicians from Cairo